Anthony Ashley-Cooper, 2nd Earl of Shaftesbury Bt (16 January 1652 – 2 November 1699), known as Lord Ashley from 1672 to 1683, was an English peer and Member of Parliament.

Shaftesbury was the son of Anthony Ashley-Cooper, 1st Earl of Shaftesbury, and Lady Frances Cecil. He was elected to the House of Commons for Weymouth and Melcombe Regis in 1673, a seat he held until 1679. In 1683 he succeeded his father in the earldom and entered the House of Lords.

Lord Shaftesbury married Lady Dorothy Manners, daughter of John Manners, 8th Earl of Rutland, in 1669. He died in November 1699, aged 47, and was succeeded in his titles by his son Anthony, who became a noted philosopher and writer.

References
Kidd, Charles, Williamson, David (editors). Debrett's Peerage and Baronetage (1990 edition). New York: St Martin's Press, 1990.

External links

|-

1652 births
1699 deaths
2
Anthony
English MPs 1661–1679